Tears of an Angel may refer to:

Music
"Tears of an Angel", a song by Marty Friedman from his 2008 album Future Addict
"Tears of an Angel", a song by Mike Oldfield from his 2005 album Light + Shade
"Tears of an Angel", a song by RyanDan from their self-titled 2007 album RyanDan

Others
Tears of an Angel (天使の涙?), 10th episode of Nightwalker: The Midnight Detective